The Greek Constitutional amendment of 1986 was proposed in order to limit the powers of the President of the Republic.  Although the president had been vested with considerable powers under the 1975 Constitution, in practice Greek presidents largely took a ceremonial role.  Nevertheless, by virtue of their mere existence they influenced the development of political affairs during the first co-existence of Constantine Karamanlis as President of the Republic with the government of PASOK from 1980 to 1986. The responsibilities of the President of the Republic were the target of the revisionary proceedings of 1985-1986.

On 6 March 1986, pursuant to article 110 of the Constitution, which stipulates that the provisions of the Constitution are subject to revision except for those which determine the form of government as a Parliamentary Republic as well as certain other provisions, eleven articles were amended and a vote was passed transposing the text of the Constitution into demotic Greek.

Through this revision, the responsibilities of the President of the Republic were curtailed to a significant extent--codifying actual practices dating from the end of military rule in 1974. Despite the political and the constitutional tensions of that period, the revised Constitution of 1975/1986, which introduced a pure parliamentary governmental system, was accepted by all political powers.

1986 documents
1986 in law
1986 in Greece
History of Greece since 1974
1980s in Greek politics
Constitution of Greece